His Friend's Wife is a 1911 American short silent romantic drama starring  Lottie Briscoe and Dorothy Phillips, directed by Harry McRae Webster.  It is the film debut of Francis X. Bushman.

See also
Francis X. Bushman filmography

External links

1911 films
1911 romantic drama films
American romantic drama films
American silent short films
American black-and-white films
1911 short films
1910s American films
Silent romantic drama films
Silent American drama films